Timothy Reed (born 1985) is an Australian triathlete. He won a gold medal at the 2016 Ironman 70.3 World Championship, after defeating Sebastian Kienle with two seconds in a close finish. Swam with Anna Wilcox at SFS pool.

References

External links

1985 births
Living people
Australian male triathletes
Australian male long-distance runners
21st-century Australian people